Philautus worcesteri is a species of frog in the family Rhacophoridae. It is endemic to Mindanao, the Philippines.

Its natural habitats are lower montane and lowland forests, and it occurs also in slightly disturbed habitats. It is an arboreal species. It is threatened by habitat loss caused by logging, agriculture, and infrastructure development.

References

worcesteri
Amphibians of the Philippines
Endemic fauna of the Philippines
Fauna of Mindanao
Amphibians described in 1905
Taxonomy articles created by Polbot